The Copa del Generalísimo 1953 Final was the 51st final of the King's Cup. The final was played at Estadio Chamartín in Madrid, on 21 June 1953, being won by CF Barcelona, who beat Atlético de Bilbao 2-1.

Details

See also
Athletic–Barcelona clásico

References

1953
Copa
FC Barcelona matches
Athletic Bilbao matches